Maria Vittoria Cassana (died 1711) was an Italian painter of the late-Baroque. She was the daughter of Giovanni Francesco Cassana. She painted small pictures of religious subjects for private collections.

See also
 Cassana (family)

References
 

1711 deaths
18th-century Italian painters
Italian Baroque painters
Italian women painters
Year of birth unknown
18th-century Italian women artists
17th-century Italian women artists